The Bond Formation is a geologic formation in Illinois, Kentucky and Indiana. It preserves fossils dating back to the Carboniferous period.

See also
 List of fossiliferous stratigraphic units in Illinois

References

 

Carboniferous Illinois
Carboniferous southern paleotropical deposits